The Roman Catholic Diocese of Edéa is a diocese located in the city of Edéa in the Ecclesiastical province of Douala in Cameroon.

History
 March 22, 1993: Established as Diocese of Edéa from the Metropolitan Archdiocese of Douala

Leadership
 Bishops of Edéa (Roman rite), in reverse chronological order
 Bishop Jean-Bosco Ntep (since October 15, 2004)
 Bishop Simon-Victor Tonyé Bakot (March 22, 1993 – October 18, 2003), appointed Archbishop of Yaoundé

See also
Roman Catholicism in Cameroon

References

External links
 GCatholic.org
 Officiel website

Roman Catholic dioceses in Cameroon
Christian organizations established in 1993
Roman Catholic dioceses and prelatures established in the 20th century
Roman Catholic Ecclesiastical Province of Douala